Andrea Pais de Libera (born 29 March 1973) is an Italian bobsledder. He competed at the 1998 Winter Olympics and the 2002 Winter Olympics.

References

External links
 

1973 births
Living people
Italian male bobsledders
Olympic bobsledders of Italy
Bobsledders at the 1998 Winter Olympics
Bobsledders at the 2002 Winter Olympics
Sportspeople from the Province of Belluno